The 1999 East India Cyclone (IMD designated BOB 05, JTWC designated 04B), was the second strongest, deadliest, and costliest of the 1999 North Indian Ocean cyclone season. On October 15, a developing area of low pressure, located 220 nm northwest of the Andaman Islands began to intensify. By 1730Z a TCFA was issued and the first advisory on Tropical Storm 04B was issued at 2100Z. 04B was moving to the west-northwest at 8–12 knots as it continued to intensify. On October 17, the storm began to turn to a more northerly direction as it intensified to a cyclone. 04B underwent explosive intensification the same day and reached its peak of 140 mph at 0000Z. The storm held this intensity as it made landfall on the Odisha coastline near Gopalpur beach at around 8am. The storm began to weaken due to the interaction with land and dissipated on October 19.
04B was responsible for at least 180 fatalities and hundreds of houses and huts in low-lying areas were destroyed by flooding. Several thousand others were injured by the storm and hundreds were left homeless. The Prime Minister of India requested that relief supplies be distributed to the affected region immediately.

Meteorological history

On October 15, a developing area of low pressure, located 220 nm northwest of the Andaman Islands began to intensify. By 1730Z a TCFA was issued and the first advisory on Tropical Storm 04B was issued at 2100Z. 04B was moving to the west-northwest at 8–12 knots as it continued to intensify. On October 17, the storm began to turn to a more northerly direction as it intensified to a cyclone. 04B underwent explosive intensification the same day and reached its peak of 140 mph at 0000Z. The storm held this intensity as it made landfall on the Odisha coastline near Gopalpur beach. The storm began to weaken due to the interaction with land and dissipated on October 19.

Impact
At least 200 trains were canceled across India.The storm hit in the middle of India's six-week general election, with rain forecast in Kolkata forcing political parties to cancel campaign events.

Odisha 
In Odisha, 197 people lost their lives, and 402 people were injured. Thousands of hectares of crops were lost. The State of Odisha has put a lot of effort into creating a disaster risk management structure after 1999.

Andhra Pradesh 
In Andhra Pradesh, one person lost their life, and millions of trees were uprooted.

See also
 1999 Odisha Cyclone - The next storm in the season that devastated similar areas.

References

Tropical cyclones in 1999